Be-Bop?, is an album by baritone saxophonist Pepper Adams and drummer Barry Altschul which was recorded in Paris in 1979 and released on  the French Musica label.

Track listing 
 "Woody 'n' You" (Dizzy Gillespie) – 7:05
 "Neuftemps" (Jean-Pierre Debarbat) – 11:04
 'You Can't Name Your Own Tune' (Barry Altschul) – 8:47
 "Julian" (Pepper Adams, George Mraz) – 4:45
 "Valse Celtique" (Adams) – 5:02

Personnel 
Pepper Adams – baritone saxophone
Barry Altschul  – drums
Jean-Pierre Debarbat – tenor saxophone
Siegfried Kessler – piano
Jacques Vidal  – bass

References 

Barry Altschul albums
Pepper Adams albums
1979 albums
Musica Records albums